Mass migrations take place, or used to take place, by the following mammals:

Africa:
Hartebeest
Springbok
Black wildebeest
Blue wildebeest
Blesbok
Tiang
Burchell's zebra
Quagga (extinct)
Thompson's gazelle
Mongalla gazelle
White-eared kob
Grant's gazelle
Scimitar-horned oryx
Giant eland
North America:
Pronghorn
Mule deer
Bison
Wapiti
Mexican free-tailed bat
North America and Eurasia:
Reindeer/caribou
Eurasia:
Siberian roe deer
Chiru
Kulan
Mongolian gazelle
Saiga

Of these migrations, those of the springbok, black wildebeest, blesbok, scimitar-horned oryx, and kulan have ceased.

References

Lists of mammals
Ethology
Ecology